West Waynesburg is a census-designated place in Franklin Township, Greene County, Pennsylvania,  United States. It is located next to the western border of Waynesburg, the Greene County seat, within a mile of downtown, along Pennsylvania Routes 18 and 21. As of the 2010 census, the population of West Waynesburg was 446.

References

External links

Census-designated places in Greene County, Pennsylvania
Census-designated places in Pennsylvania